Sir Sydney Richard Wells, 1st Baronet, DL (3 August 1879 – 16 November 1957) was a British baronet, the first of the Wells baronets of Felmersham, and a Conservative Party politician. He was the Member of Parliament (MP) for Bedford from 1922 to 1945.

Biography
Born on 3 August 1879, the son of Charles Wells (1842–1914), founder of the brewery company Charles Wells Ltd, Sir Richard Wells was educated at Bedford School. He was Conservative Member of Parliament (MP) for Bedford, between 1922 and 1945, and the first of the Wells baronets of Felmersham, created on 21 January 1944.

Wells died on 26 November 1957 and was succeeded as Baronet by his son, Sir Charles Maltby Wells, 2nd Baronet (1908–96).

Wife and children
Wells was married to an artist, Dorothy, née Maltby, who bore him seven sons and two daughters. They included twins, Oliver and Sarah, who were born in 1922. Wells' elder daughter, Sydney, was married to a Royal Navy officer. All of Wells' other eight children served in the armed forces in the Second World War, which led to the family being dubbed "The Fighting Wellses of Felmersham".

Wells lost three sons in combat. Sqn Ldr James "Jimmy" Wells commanded No. 600 Squadron RAF and was killed when his Bristol Blenheim was shot down over The Netherlands on 10 May 1940. Major Thomas "Tom" Wells served in the Bedfordshire and Hertfordshire Regiment and was killed in the Battle of Singapore on 13 or 14 February 1942.

Wells' eldest son, Charles Maltby Wells, served in the Royal Engineers and reached the rank of lieutenant colonel. Another son, David, served in the Burma campaign and was awarded the Military Cross. Another, George Crichton Wells, served in the Royal Army Medical Corps and reached the rank of Major. Wells' younger daughter, Sarah, joined the Women's Royal Naval Service in 1942. She served as a motorcycle despatch rider and by the end of the war was a Leading Wren.

Sarah's twin brother, Oliver, served in No. 7 Squadron RAF. On 30 August 1943 his Avro Lancaster was shot down in Belgium but he survived the crash and the Belgian Resistance sheltered him. Four months later the Comet Line tried to get him to Spain, but he was captured in Brussels. He spent the rest of the conflict as a prisoner of war, much of it in Stalag Luft III in Silesia.

After the war Oliver served with No. 203 Squadron RAF, flew a Short Sunderland in the Berlin Airlift and was promoted to Wing commander. After their armed forces careers David and Oliver Wells became directors of the Charles Wells brewing business, and served as successive chairmen. Their brother George became a leading dermatologist.

References

External links
 

1879 births
1957 deaths
People educated at Bedford School
Conservative Party (UK) MPs for English constituencies
UK MPs 1922–1923
UK MPs 1923–1924
UK MPs 1924–1929
UK MPs 1929–1931
UK MPs 1931–1935
UK MPs 1935–1945
Baronets in the Baronetage of the United Kingdom
Deputy Lieutenants of Bedfordshire
People from Felmersham